Jordi Casanovas Güell (born 1978 in Vilafranca del Penedès) is a Catalan playwright.

Bibliography

Plays
Les millors occasions. 2002
Gebre. 2003
Estralls. 2003
Andorra. 2004
Neoburning Generation. 2005
Beckenbauer. 2005
Kuina Katalana. 2005
Wolfenstein. 2006
Tetris. 2006
City/Simcity. 2007
Aquesta tampoc serà la fi del món. 2007
La ruïna. 2008[1]
Lena Woyzeck. 2008
La revolució. 2009
Julia Smells. 2009
Transició. 2010
Sopar amb batalla. 2010
Un home amb ulleres de pasta. 2010
Una història catalana. 2011
Pàtria. 2012
Köttbulle. 2014
Ruz-Bárcenas. 2014
Idiota. 2014
Vilafranca. 2015
Hey Boy Hey Girl. 2015
Port Arthur. 2015
Cervantes. 2016

Awarded plays

Les millors occasions  Premi Internacional AIET de Teatre Universitari "Josep Robrenyo", 2002
Beckenbauer  Ciutat d'Alcoi de teatre, 2005
Andorra  Marqués de Bradomín, 2005
Estralls  Premi "Eduard Escalante" Premis Ciutat de València 2006
Hardocore Videogames, una trilogia (Wolfenstein, Tetris, City/Simcity)  Premi de la crítica Serra d'Or al millor text del 2006 i Premi Revelació de la crítica de Barcelona 2007

External links

See (FLYHARD theatre company official page)

See (Qui és qui. Lletres catalanes)

See (FLYHARD theatre company blog)

Writers from Catalonia
1978 births
Living people